Sir David Courtney Suchet  (born 2 May 1946) is an English actor known for his work on British stage and television. He portrayed Edward Teller in the television serial Oppenheimer (1980) and received the RTS and BPG awards for his performance as Augustus Melmotte in the British serial The Way We Live Now (2001). International acclaim and recognition followed his performance as Agatha Christie's detective Hercule Poirot in Agatha Christie's Poirot (1989–2013), for which he received a 1991 British Academy of Film and Television Arts (BAFTA) nomination.

Early life and family
Suchet was born in the Paddington area of London, the son of Joan Patricia (née Jarché; 1916–1992), an actress, and Jack Suchet. Jack emigrated from South Africa to England in 1932, trained to be a physician at St Mary's Hospital Medical School, London, in 1933, and became an obstetrician and gynaecologist.

Suchet's father was of Lithuanian-Jewish descent, the son of Izidor Suchedowitz, originally from Kretinga in the Pale of Settlement of the Russian Empire. At some point, the family name was recorded as "Schohet", a Yiddish word (from Hebrew shochet) defining the profession of kosher butcher. Suchet's father changed his surname to Suchet while living in South Africa. David's mother was born in England and was Anglican (she was of Russian-Jewish descent on her father's side, and English Anglican on her mother's side). He was raised without religion, but became a practising Anglican in 1986, and was confirmed in 2006.

Suchet and his brothers, John and Peter, attended Grenham House boarding school in Birchington-on-Sea, Kent; then, after attending another independent school, Wellington School in Somerset, he took an interest in acting and joined the National Youth Theatre at the age of 16. He trained at the London Academy of Music and Dramatic Art, where he now serves as a council member.

His elder brother, John, is a British television presenter and former ITN newscaster. Suchet's nephew is the RT broadcaster Rory Suchet.

Career

Theatre
Suchet began his acting career at the Gateway Theatre, Chester (1969), and then appeared in many reps, including Worthing, Birmingham, Belgrade Theatre, Coventry, Liverpool Playhouse, and the Watermill Theatre. In 1973, he joined the Royal Shakespeare Company. In 1981–82, he played Bolingbroke in Richard II opposite Alan Howard. In 1993 he played "John" in the drama Oleanna at the Royal Court Theatre. It was directed by Harold Pinter, and co-starred Lia Williams as "Carol". He made his West End debut opposite Saskia Reeves in the Kempinski play Separation, at the Comedy Theatre in 1987. In 1996–97 he played opposite Dame Diana Rigg in the West End production of Who's Afraid of Virginia Woolf? He was also featured as Salieri from 1998 to 2000 in the Broadway production Amadeus. In 2007, at the Chichester Festival Theatre, he played Cardinal Benelli in The Last Confession, about the death of Pope John Paul I. In 2014, he reprised the role of Benelli in the Australian tour of the play.

He has been starring as Lady Bracknell in  The Importance of Being Earnest by Oscar Wilde at the Vaudeville Theatre in London since June 2015 and on tour. In January 2022, Suchet had a three-week residency at the Harold Pinter Theatre performing Poirot and More, A Retrospective.

Television and film
In 1988, Suchet played Leopold Bloom in the Channel 4 documentary The Modern World: Ten Great Writers, in which some of James Joyce's Ulysses was dramatised. The year 1988 also saw Suchet appear in the penultimate episode of the television series Tales of the Unexpected. He appeared as Yves Drouard, a scheming adulterer, in the episode A Time To Die.

In 1989, he took the title role of Hercule Poirot for the long-running television series Agatha Christie's Poirot. In his book, Poirot and Me, Suchet mentions that prior Poirot actor Sir Peter Ustinov one day approached him and told him that Suchet could play Poirot and would be good at it. Suchet then spoke to Brian Eastman from ITV, who sent him some of the novels to read. "And as I did so, it slowly dawned on me that I'd never actually seen the character I was reading about on the screen...He was quite, quite different: more elusive, more pedantic and, most of all, more human than the person I'd seen on the screen." Still unsure, Suchet rang his brother John, who advised him against it, calling Poirot "a bit of a joke, a buffoon. It's not you at all." Suchet took his brother's advice as a challenge and accepted the role. In preparation, he wrote a five page character study of Poirot detailing 93 different aspects of his life. Suchet said he took the list on set with him and "gave a copy to every director I worked with on a Poirot film."
Suchet went on to play the role in adaptations of every novel and short story featuring the character written by Agatha Christie.

In 2001, he had the lead role in the David Yates-directed BBC television serial The Way We Live Now and, in April 2002, he played the real-life barrister George Carman in the BBC drama Get Carman: The Trials of George Carman QC.

In 2003, Suchet starred as the ambitious Cardinal Wolsey in the two-part ITV drama Henry VIII opposite Ray Winstone as Henry VIII and Helena Bonham Carter as Anne Boleyn. In May 2006, he played the role of the fallen press baron Robert Maxwell in Maxwell, a BBC2 dramatisation of the final 18 months of Maxwell's life. During the same year, he voiced Poirot in the adventure game Agatha Christie: Murder on the Orient Express.

At Christmas 2006, he played the vampire hunter Abraham Van Helsing in a BBC adaptation of Bram Stoker's novel Dracula. He appeared in the disaster film Flood, released in August 2007, as the Deputy Prime Minister of the United Kingdom at a time when London is devastated by flooding. Suchet appeared on daytime-TV chat show Loose Women on 6 February 2008 to talk about his film The Bank Job, in which he played Lew Vogel, alongside Jason Statham and Saffron Burrows. In 2008, he took part in the genealogy documentary series Who Do You Think You Are?.

He starred in the 2009 CBC made-for-TV film Diverted. He starred as the main antagonist, Reacher Gilt, in the 2010 Sky TV adaptation of Going Postal, based on Pratchett's book of the same name. He appeared in the film Act of God as Benjamin Cisco. In 1987, Suchet played a bigfoot hunter in Harry and the Hendersons. He had roles in two Michael Douglas films, A Perfect Murder and The In-Laws. In 1997, he starred in the independent film Sunday.

Between 2014 and 2015, Suchet appeared in and narrated two BBC Television documentaries, undertaking an epic journey spanning the Mediterranean, inspired by the life and travels of the apostles St. Peter and St. Paul.

In 2016, Suchet took on the role of the narrator in the BBC live production of Peter Pan Goes Wrong, where he serves as the sole "professional" among the cast. At one point during the broadcast, when one of the actors is electrocuted, he is asked to distract the audience. His solution is to take Captain Hook's mustache and start acting like Poirot, even delivering his lines in a Belgian accent. This prompts the director (who is also playing Captain Hook) to retrieve the mustache and dismiss Suchet.

In 2017, Suchet starred as Dr Fagan in the BBC1 adaptation of Evelyn Waugh's Decline and Fall, and guest starred in the role of a character called "The Landlord", for an episode of the tenth series of Doctor Who entitled Knock Knock.

Canal Trust and River Thames Alliance
Suchet is vice-president of the Lichfield and Hatherton Canals Trust, whose most challenging achievement to date has been securing funding (both via an appeal and from influencing government decisions) concerning the building of the new M6 Toll motorway where it cuts the lines of the Lichfield Canal and the Hatherton Canal, both of which the Trust wishes to see reopened. He was also officially voted in as chairman of the River Thames Alliance in November 2005. At the July 2006 Annual General Meeting of the River Thames Alliance, he agreed to continue being chairman for another year. He is a patron of the River Thames Boat Project.

Awards, honours and appointments
Suchet's first major award was the Royal Television Society's award for best male actor for A Song for Europe in 1985. His performance as Agatha Christie's famous detective Hercule Poirot in the television series Poirot earned him a 1991 British Academy Television Award (BAFTA) nomination. In preparation for the role he says that he read every novel and short story and compiled an extensive file on Poirot. Suchet was given a Variety Club Award in 1994 for best actor for portraying John in David Mamet's play Oleanna at the Royal Court Theatre, London. He later won another Variety Club Award (as well as a 2000 Tony nomination for best performance by a leading actor in a play) for his portrayal of Antonio Salieri in a revival of Amadeus.

Suchet was nominated for another Royal Television Society award in 2002 for his performance as Augustus Melmotte in The Way We Live Now, which also earned him a BAFTA nomination. The same year, he was appointed Officer of the Order of the British Empire (OBE). On 10 October 2008, Suchet was awarded an honorary degree for his contributions to the Arts, from the University of Chichester. This was presented by the Vice-Chancellor at the Chichester Festival Theatre. In November 2008 Suchet won an International Emmy Award for Best Actor at the International Emmy Awards in New York for his role as tycoon Robert Maxwell in the 2007 BBC television film, Maxwell.

On 7 January 2009, he was awarded Freedom of the City of London, at the Guildhall in London. On 13 July 2010, David Suchet was awarded an honorary degree from the University of Kent at Canterbury Cathedral in Canterbury. He was appointed Commander of the Order of the British Empire (CBE) in the 2011 New Year Honours for "services to drama". On 18 March 2014, Suchet was given a Lifetime Achievement Award at the RTS Programme Awards 2013 for his outstanding performance in Agatha Christies Poirot. Suchet is Honorary President of The Leica Society.

Suchet was knighted in the 2020 Birthday Honours for services to drama and charity.

Personal life

Family and genealogy
In 1972, Suchet first met his wife, Sheila Ferris, at the Belgrade Theatre, Coventry, where they were both working; he says that he fell in love with her as soon as he saw her, and that it took a while to persuade her to go out for a meal with him. They were married on 30 June 1976; the couple have a son, Robert (b. 1981), formerly a captain in the Royal Marines, and a daughter, Katherine (b. 1983), a physiotherapist.

Suchet is the brother of John Suchet, a former national news presenter for Five News and presenter of the evening concert on Classic FM (2020). He is the uncle of broadcaster Richard Suchet, who is the son of Suchet's younger brother, Peter.

Suchet's maternal grandfather, James Jarché, was a famous Fleet Street photographer notable for the first pictures of Edward VIII and Wallis Simpson and also for his pictures of Louis Blériot (1909) and the Siege of Sidney Street. Suchet first became interested in photography when his grandfather gave him a Leica M3 camera as a present. The Jarché family was originally named Jarchy, and were Russian Jews.

Suchet's paternal grandfather, Isidor Shokhet, was a 
Lithuanian Jew  and lived in Kretinga, a Lithuanian city in the Pale of Settlement of the Russian Empire. Until 1791, Kretinga was part of the combined Polish–Lithuanian Commonwealth. After the end of World War II it is now solely part of Lithuania. The surname shochet is Yiddish (derived from Hebrew) for "kosher butcher".

Suche means "dry" in Polish. Suched+o+witz resembles the common Polish name construction using the [root]+wicz and putting the letter o in between as is grammatically mandated when the last letter of the root is d, h, n, t, among others. For instance, Janowicz=Jan+o+wicz becomes German-Yiddish by replacing the combination "cz" with "tz", e.g. Janowitz.

Isidor again changed his surname to Suchet after moving to Cape Town, South Africa.

Suchet's great-great-great-grandfather, George Jezzard, was a master mariner. He was captain of the brig Hannah, which sank nine miles off the coast of Suffolk during a violent storm on 28 May 1860, in which more than 100 vessels sank and at least 40 people died. Jezzard and six others of his crew were saved by local rescuers just before their ship sank.

Religious beliefs
Raised without religion, in 1986 Suchet underwent a religious conversion after reading Romans 8 in his hotel room; soon afterwards, he was baptised into the Church of England. Suchet stated in an interview with Strand Magazine, "I'm a Christian by faith. I like to think it sees me through a great deal of my life. I very much believe in the principles of Christianity and the principles of most religions, actually—that one has to abandon oneself to a higher good." In 2012, Suchet made a documentary for the BBC on his personal hero, Saint Paul, to discover what he was like as a man by charting his evangelistic journey around the Mediterranean. Two years later, he would film another documentary, this time on the apostle Saint Peter.

On 22 November 2012, the British Bible Society announced the appointment of David Suchet and Dr Paula Gooder as new vice-presidents. They joined the existing vice-presidents: John Sentamu (Archbishop of York), Vincent Nichols (Archbishop of Westminster), Barry Morgan (Archbishop of Wales), David F. Ford (Regius Professor of Divinity at Cambridge), Joel Edwards (International Director of Micah Challenge) and Lord Alton of Liverpool. Following the time when he bade farewell to his role as Hercule Poirot, Suchet fulfilled a 27-year ambition to make an audio recording of The Bible's New International Version, which was released on 24 April 2014.

Political views
In August 2014, Suchet was one of 200 public figures who were signatories to a letter to The Guardian expressing their hope that Scotland would vote to remain part of the United Kingdom in the September 2014 referendum on that issue.

Filmography

Film

Television

Stage

Video games
Agatha Christie: Murder on the Orient Express (2006)

Interviews and TV documentaries

Poirot and Agatha Christie
 Being Poirot BBC documentary (2014)
 David Suchet on playing Hercule Poirot – Dead Man’s Folly Q&A – BFI 
 David Suchet Final Poirot scene hardest of my career BBC 2013 
 David Suchet on Poirot's Death  Loose Women ITV 2015 
 Au revoir Hercule Poirot – BBC News 
 Poirot's David Suchet ITV 
 The David Suchet Interview by Studio 10 (Australia) The ultra-smooth talking David Suchet aka Agatha Christie's Hercule Poirot drops by Studio 10.
 Premier.tv : David Suchet talks about Poirot 
 Holly and Phil chat with David Suchet BBC – 13 November 2013 
 Today Tonight – David Suchet Channel Seven, Perth (Australia) 2014 
 David Suchet interviewed by Clive Anderson BBC, Wogan 1990s 
 The Mystery of Agatha Christie ITV Perspectives, 2013.
 Agatha Christie BBC documentary 
 The Agatha Christie code ITV 2005

BBC documentaries
 David Suchet on the Orient Express (TV documentary) (2010) 
 David Suchet: In the Footsteps of St Paul (BBC documentary) (2012) 
 David Suchet: In the Footsteps of St Peter (BBC Documentary) (2015)

Other interviews
 The One Show: David Suchet – Interview (30 April 2015) BBC 
 Long Day's Journey into Night David Suchet on acting, Digital Theatre Plus 2013 
 Roles, Characters, Empathy: David Suchet (On) Acting 2012 
 Suchet receives CBE BCC 2011 
 David Suchet, Actor – A Birthday Tribute 2011 
 International Emmy Winner – David Suchet BBC 2009 
 David Suchet – Who Do You Think You Are BBC 2009 
 Cannes Interview with David Suchet May 1997

Further reading
 Suchet, David and Wansell, Geoffrey. Poirot and Me. Headline Book Publishing, 7 November 2013 (UK), 1 October 2014 (US).

References

External links

David Suchet on Biography Channel

1946 births
Living people
20th-century English male actors
21st-century English male actors
Actors awarded knighthoods
Agatha Award winners
Alumni of the London Academy of Music and Dramatic Art
Commanders of the Order of the British Empire
Converts to Anglicanism
Critics' Circle Theatre Award winners
English Anglicans
English male film actors
English male radio actors
English male stage actors
English male television actors
English people of Lithuanian-Jewish descent
English people of Russian-Jewish descent
English people of South African-Jewish descent
International Emmy Award for Best Actor winners
Knights Bachelor
Male actors from London
National Youth Theatre members
People educated at Wellington School, Somerset
People from Paddington
People from Pinner
Royal Shakespeare Company members